More Tales of the City (1980) is the second book in the Tales of the City series by San Francisco novelist Armistead Maupin, originally serialized in the San Francisco Chronicle. It was adapted into the 1998 miniseries More Tales of the City.

Plot
The story begins a couple of months after the end of Tales of the City. Michael ("Mouse") Tolliver and Mary Ann Singleton go on a cruise on the Pacific Princess, thanks to money left to her by her former, now-deceased boss, Edgar Halcyon. While on the cruise, Mary Ann begins a relationship with a handsome amnesiac, while Mouse rekindles his relationship with his former boyfriend Jon, who has now distanced himself from the "A Gays" after getting fed up with their elitist and shallow ways. Mary Ann begins to devote her time to helping her now-boyfriend, Burke Andrew, figure out why he lost his memory. Signs point to a trauma he had while reporting on a story for his newspaper. What they find out is explosive and risks shaking the foundations of San Francisco elite society. Meanwhile, Mouse becomes extremely ill and is hospitalized, profoundly affecting his relationship with Jon.

References

1980 American novels
1980s LGBT novels
Novels by Armistead Maupin
Tales of the City
Novels first published in serial form
Works originally published in the San Francisco Chronicle
Novels set in San Francisco
Harper & Row books
American LGBT novels
American novels adapted into television shows